The Norwegian Fencing Federation (Norwegian : Norges Fekteforbund - NF) is the national organism for fencing in Norway. The president is Junjie Cao. The vice-president is Claes Bendiksen.
The headquarters are in Oslo.

Organisation
President: Junjie Cao
Vice-president: Claes Bendiksen

Former presidents
Severin Finne, president of the Norwegian Fencing Federation (1921-1923) and (1924-1925)

External links
Norwegian Fencing Federation

Fencing
Fencing organizations
Organisations based in Oslo
Fencing in Norway